Gerard Barcia Duedra (born 9 November 1963) is an Andorran trap shooter who competed in the 1996 Summer Olympics.

Barcia competed in the trap shooting event at the 1996 Summer Olympics, and after two days of shooting Barcia scored 117 points and finished the competition in 37th place so didn't qualify for the final.

References

Shooters at the 1996 Summer Olympics
1963 births
Andorran male sport shooters
Olympic shooters of Andorra
Living people